Kari Kola (also Romanized as Karī Kolā; also known as Kolārī Kalā and Kolārī Kolā) is a village in Deraz Kola Rural District, Babol Kenar District, Babol County, Mazandaran Province, Iran. At the 2006 census, its population was 617, in 168 families.

References 

Populated places in Babol County